This is a list of United Arab Emirati One-day International cricketers. A One Day International, or an ODI, is an international cricket match between two representative teams, each having ODI status, as determined by the International Cricket Council (ICC). An ODI differs from Test matches in that the number of overs per team is limited, and that each team has only one innings. The list is arranged in the order in which each player won his first ODI cap. Where more than one player won his first ODI cap in the same match, those players are listed alphabetically by surname - or, in the case of Muslims, by first name.

Key

Players
Statistics are correct as of 16 March 2023.

References

United Arab Emirates ODI
Cricketers, ODI
Cricketers ODI
United Arab Emirates in international cricket